Adam Duff O'Toole ( or ; died 11 April 1328) was an Irishman burned at the stake in Dublin for heresy and blasphemy. What is known about O'Toole comes from a letter from the leaders of the Pale, the Hiberno-Norman colony around Dublin, to Pope John XXII asking him to authorise a crusade against the Irish. The letter names "Aduk Duff Octohyl" as leader of a host of Irish heretics. Modern historians regard the heresy accusations as politically motivated, and the letter as a counter to the Irish Remonstrance of 1317. Adam Duff was the son of Walter Duff, Chief of the Name of the Clan O'Toole, based in the Wicklow Mountains. The O'Tooles had formed an alliance with the King of Leinster, Domhnall mac Art MacMurrough-Kavanagh and Edward Bruce, to wage war against English rule over Ireland.  Holinshed's Chronicles states:

Hogging or Hogges Green was a green extending south and east from the modern College Green and centred on the Hogges, a Norse Dublin Thing mound.

References

Further reading
 "The heresy of being Irish : Adducc Dubh O'Toole and two MacConmaras" in Maeve Brigid Callan  The Templars, the witch, and the wild Irish : vengeance and heresy in medieval Ireland (Cornell University Press, 2015)

External links
 The Heretic’s Tale: Adam Duff O'Toole (died 1327 AD) a 2010 lecture by Bernadette Williams at Dublin City Libraries.

1327 deaths
14th-century Irish people
Medieval Gaels from Ireland
People from County Dublin
People from County Wicklow
People executed for heresy
Executed Irish people
Year of birth unknown
People convicted of blasphemy in Ireland
People executed for blasphemy